Eupithecia candicans is a moth in the  family Geometridae. It is found in Cameroon and possibly Kenya.

References

Moths described in 1988
candicans
Moths of Africa